is a railway station in the city of Minokamo, Gifu Prefecture, Japan, operated by the third sector railway operator Nagaragawa Railway.

Lines

Station layout
Kamono Station has one ground-level side platform serving a single bi-directional track. The station is unattended.

Adjacent stations

|-
!colspan=5|Nagaragawa Railway

History
Operations were transferred from the Japan National Railway (JNR) to the Nagaragawa Railway on December 11, 1986, and the station was renamed to its present name on the same day.

Passenger statistics
In fiscal 2013, the station was used by an average of 48 passengers daily (boarding passengers only).

Surrounding area

See also
 List of Railway Stations in Japan

References

External links

 

Railway stations in Japan opened in 1952
Railway stations in Gifu Prefecture
Stations of Nagaragawa Railway
Minokamo, Gifu